Charles Griffith (28 May 1889 – 12 May 1928) was an Australian cricketer. He played in four first-class matches for Queensland between 1913 and 1924.

See also
 List of Queensland first-class cricketers

References

External links
 

1889 births
1928 deaths
Australian cricketers
Queensland cricketers
Sportspeople from Townsville
Cricketers from Brisbane